Gazelle is a census-designated place (CDP) in Siskiyou County, California, United States.  Its population is 95 as of the 2020 census, up from 70 from the 2010 census.

Name
The name, that of a small African antelope, was given to the post office in 1870.  In the 1850s a steamer Gazelle plied the waters between San Francisco and the upper Sacramento River.

Geography
Gazelle is located at  (41.521538, -122.520718).

Demographics

2010
The 2010 United States Census reported that Gazelle had a population of 70. The racial makeup of Gazelle was 65 (92.9%) White, 0 (0.0%) African American, 4 (5.7%) Native American, 0 (0.0%) Asian, 0 (0.0%) Pacific Islander, 1 (1.4%) from other races, and 0 (0.0%) from two or more races. Hispanic or Latino of any race were 5 persons (7.1%).

The Census reported that 70 people (100% of the population) lived in households, 0 (0%) lived in non-institutionalized group quarters, and 0 (0%) were institutionalized.

There were 37 households, out of which 4 (10.8%) had children under the age of 18 living in them, 15 (40.5%) were opposite-sex married couples living together, 1 (2.7%) had a female householder with no husband present, 4 (10.8%) had a male householder with no wife present.  There were 1 (2.7%) unmarried opposite-sex partnerships, and 0 (0%) same-sex married couples or partnerships. 15 households (40.5%) were made up of individuals, and 7 (18.9%) had someone living alone who was 65 years of age or older. The average household size was 1.89.  There were 20 families (54.1% of all households); the average family size was 2.45.

The population was spread out, with 8 people (11.4%) under the age of 18, 5 people (7.1%) aged 18 to 24, 11 people (15.7%) aged 25 to 44, 28 people (40.0%) aged 45 to 64, and 18 people (25.7%) who were 65 years of age or older.  The median age was 53.7 years. For every 100 females, there were 112.1 males.  For every 100 females age 18 and over, there were 113.8 males.

The homeowner vacancy rate was 3.6%; the rental vacancy rate was 35.3%.  44 people (62.9% of the population) lived in owner-occupied housing units and 26 people (37.1%) lived in rental housing units.

2000
As of the census of 2000, there were 136 people, 57 households, and 38 families residing in the CDP. The racial makeup of the CDP was 88.97% White, 3.68% Native American, 1.47% from other races, and 5.88% from two or more races. Hispanic or Latino of any race were 2.21% of the population.

There were 57 households, out of which 24.6% had children under the age of 18 living with them, 49.1% were married couples living together, 10.5% had a female householder with no husband present, and 31.6% were non-families. 24.6% of all households were made up of individuals, and 10.5% had someone living alone who was 65 years of age or older. The average household size was 2.39 and the average family size was 2.77.

In the CDP, the population was spread out, with 21.3% under the age of 18, 6.6% from 18 to 24, 27.9% from 25 to 44, 23.5% from 45 to 64, and 20.6% who were 65 years of age or older. The median age was 42 years. For every 100 females, there were 97.1 males. For every 100 females age 18 and over, there were 101.9 males.

The median income for a household in the CDP was $30,625, and the median income for a family was $31,042. Males had a median income of $36,250 versus $21,250 for females. The per capita income for the CDP was $12,194. There were 28.2% of families and 28.6% of the population living below the poverty line, including 28.1% of under eighteens and 12.0% of those over 64.

Politics

References

Census-designated places in Siskiyou County, California
Census-designated places in California